Clemente Confetti or Clemente Confetto (died in 1644) was a Roman Catholic prelate who served as Bishop of Acerno (1643–1644), Bishop of Muro Lucano (1630–1643), and Titular Bishop of Tiberias (1623–1630).

Biography
On 9 January 1623, Clemente Confetti was appointed  Titular Bishop of Tiberias and Coadjutor Bishop of Muro Lucano by Pope Gregory XV.
On 22 January 1623, he was consecrated bishop by Marco Antonio Gozzadini, Cardinal-Priest of Sant'Eusebio, with Alessandro Bosco, Bishop of Gerace, and Carlo Bovi, Bishop of Bagnoregio, serving as co-consecrators. 
He succeeded to the bishopric of Muro Lucano on 8 January 1630.
On 13 April 1643, he was appointed  Bishop of Acerno by Pope Urban VIII.
He served as Bishop of Acerno until his death in 1644.
 
While bishop, he was the principal co-consecrator of Alessandro Sibilia, Bishop of Capri (1637).

References

External links and additional sources
 (for Chronology of Bishops) 
 (for Chronology of Bishops)  
 (for Chronology of Bishops) 
 (for Chronology of Bishops) 
 (for Chronology of Bishops) 
 (for Chronology of Bishops) 

17th-century Italian Roman Catholic bishops
Bishops appointed by Pope Gregory XV
Bishops appointed by Pope Urban VIII
1644 deaths